Jon Duncan (born 6 October 1975) is a British orienteering competitor and world champion.

He received a gold medal in the relay event at the 2008 World Orienteering Championships in Olomouc, together with Graham Gristwood and Jamie Stevenson.
He received a bronze medal in relay at the 2003 World Orienteering Championships in Rapperswil/Jona, together with Daniel Marston and Jamie Stevenson

He finished 5th in the world championship relay in 1999, and also 5th in 2004. In both 2000 and 2001 Duncan won the British long distance orienteering championships.

In 2009 he won the prestigious Jukola Relay with club Kristiansand OK.

See also

 List of orienteers
 List of orienteering events

References

External links

1975 births
Living people
British orienteers
Male orienteers
Foot orienteers
World Orienteering Championships medalists
Alumni of the University of Edinburgh